Cha Yun-hee (born 26 February 1986) is a retired South Korean footballer who last played for Gyeongju KHNP in the WK League.

In April 2009, she was loaned to SC 07 Bad Neuenahr for one year and two months.

Honors

Club
Icheon Daekyo
 WK League: 2011, 2012

International 
 EAFF Women's Football Championship: 2005
 Asian Games Bronze medal: 2010

Individual
 WK League MVP: 2011, 2012

References

External links 
SC 07 Bad Neuenahr Official website profile 
National Team Player Record 

1986 births
Living people
South Korean women's footballers
South Korea women's international footballers
SC 07 Bad Neuenahr players
WK League players
Expatriate women's footballers in Germany
South Korean expatriates in Germany
Asian Games medalists in football
Footballers at the 2010 Asian Games
Asian Games bronze medalists for South Korea
Medalists at the 2010 Asian Games
Women's association football forwards
South Korea women's under-20 international footballers